Andrey Alexandrovich Melnikov (11 April 1968 – 8 January 1988) was a machine gunner with the rank of private in the 9th Company of the 345th Independent Guards Airborne Regiment under the 40th Army during the Soviet-Afghan war.

Melnikov was present during the Battle for Hill 3234 as an RPK gunner. During the late night of January 8, Melnikov blunted a strong mujahideen attack on the 9th Company's position, at the cost of his life. For his bravery and skill under fire, Melnikov was posthumously awarded the title of Hero of the Soviet Union.

See also
 Vyacheslav Alexandrovich Alexandrov

References

https://web.archive.org/web/20160303230758/http://www.rsva.ru/biblio/prose_af/afgan-soldiers/5.shtml

1968 births
1988 deaths
People from Mogilev
Heroes of the Soviet Union
Belarusian military personnel
Soviet military personnel killed in the Soviet-Afghan War
Soviet military personnel of the Soviet–Afghan War
Personnel of the Soviet Airborne Forces
Belarusian aviators